Thomas Sanchou (born 23 November 1981) is a French rugby union player. His position is Centre or Fly-half and he currently plays for Castres Olympique in the Top 14. He began his career with SC Albi, before moving to Castres Olympique in 2008.

References

1981 births
Living people
French rugby union players
Sportspeople from Pau, Pyrénées-Atlantiques
Castres Olympique players
Rugby union centres
Rugby union fly-halves